Ali Ulusoy (born 15 February 1996) is a Dutch football player of Turkish descent who most recently played for SV Heimstetten.

Club career
He made his professional debut in the Eerste Divisie for Jong FC Utrecht on 5 August 2016 in a game against NAC Breda.

References

External links
 
 

1996 births
Living people
Association football defenders
Dutch footballers
Dutch people of Turkish descent
Jong FC Utrecht players
FC Volendam players
SV Heimstetten players
Eerste Divisie players
Footballers from Rotterdam